Rami Fayez (Arabic:رامي فايز) (born 23 September 1986) is a Qatari footballer plays for Al-Sailiya as a left back.

Amir cup champion with Rayyan sc 2 times = 2010-2011
Qatari league champion with Lekhwiya sc= 2012
Prince cup champion with al Jaish sc =2014

External links

References

Qatari footballers
Qatar international footballers
Qatari people of Jordanian descent
1986 births
Living people
Al-Rayyan SC players
Lekhwiya SC players
Qatar SC players
El Jaish SC players
Umm Salal SC players
Al-Arabi SC (Qatar) players
Al-Sailiya SC players
Naturalised citizens of Qatar
Qatar Stars League players
Association football fullbacks